"Old Flames Can't Hold a Candle to You" is a country song written by singer-songwriter Pebe Sebert and Hugh Moffatt. It was a number 14 U.S. country hit for Joe Sun in 1978, and a number 86 hit for Brian Collins the same year. It was later covered by Dolly Parton, who took it to the top of the U.S. country singles charts in August 1980.  Parton included her version on her 1980 Dolly, Dolly, Dolly album, and it was released as the album's second single after the success of "Starting Over Again". In 2013, Sebert's daughter, Kesha, released an acoustic cover of the song as part of her extended play Deconstructed. A new version featuring Parton is a track on Kesha's 2017 album Rainbow.

Content
In the song, the narrator tells their lover not to feel threatened by past affairs for these "old flames" are in the past and disappear from memory because of the current love.

Chart performance

Joe Sun

Brian Collins

Dolly Parton

References

External links
Old Flames Can't Hold a Candle to You lyrics at Dolly Parton On-Line

1978 singles
1980 singles
Brian Collins (1970s singer) songs
Dolly Parton songs
Joe Sun songs
RCA Records singles
Songs written by Hugh Moffatt
Songs written by Pebe Sebert
1978 songs
Song recordings produced by Gary Klein (producer)
Kesha songs